Sri Chaitanya School is an educational institute in Eluru, Andhra Pradesh, India.

Sri Chaitanya started in 1986 with a girls junior college in Vijayawada. A boys junior college was opened later in 1991. Branches were opened in Hyderabad (1996), Visakhapatnam (1998), and  various other districts   in Andhra Pradesh and Telangana.

Sri Chaitanya Techno School (abbreviated as SCTS) was opened in Eluru. It is also known as Chaitanya school main branch in West Godavari district.The institution introduced Tollywood actor Allu Arjun and Indian cricketer Rohit Sharma as the brand ambassadors.

Amazon Academy and Sri Chaitanya School have announced a collaboration to introduce full syllabus courses for joint entrance exam (JEE) and National Eligibility cum Entrance Test (NEET) preparation. The collaboration will enable the students to learn from each other and get access to learning modules, curated content and assessment material on Amazon Academy, according to the statement. During the COVID-19 pandemic,  Sri Chaitanya launched its mobile app Infinity Learn. The app provides educational content for classes 6 to 12, and JEE, NEET.  The app introduced Tollywood actor Allu Arjun and Indian cricketer Rohit Sharma as the brand ambassadors.

In September 2022 the Andhra Pradesh State Commission for Protection of Child Rights and Board of Intermediate Education conducted an inquiry against a lecturer from the Sri Chaitanya Junior College for allegedly kicking the school student and giving corporal punishment. The lecturer confessed to the crime and was fired []. In different campuses of the school similar incidents were reported in 2018 when the dance teacher allegedly beat the students, in 2018 a student was allegedly made to do sit-ups for missing school due to Typhoid fever, in 2016 when the teacher of the school was arrested for caning the students  and in 2014 when the principal of the Sri Chaitanya Junior College allegedly thrashed the student for coming late. Corporal punishment is illegal in India.

References

External links

Schools in West Godavari district
Education in Eluru
1986 establishments in Andhra Pradesh
Educational institutions established in 1986